New Hampshire Route 122 (abbreviated NH 122) is a  north–south highway in Hillsborough County in southeastern New Hampshire, United States. The highway runs from Amherst south to Hollis on the Massachusetts border.

The southern terminus of NH 122 is at the Massachusetts state line in Hollis, where the road continues into Massachusetts as an unnumbered local road in the town of Pepperell. The northern terminus of NH 122 is at an interchange with New Hampshire Route 101 in Amherst.

Major intersections

References

External links

 New Hampshire State Route 122 on Flickr

122
Transportation in Hillsborough County, New Hampshire